Boris Vladimirovich Ivanov  (1920 — 2002) was a  Soviet and Russian film and theater actor. People's Artist of the RSFSR (1981).

Selected filmography 

 Hussar Ballad (1962) as general Ducier
 All the King's Men (1971, TV Mini-Series) as Daffy
 Investigation Held by ZnaToKi (1971, TV Mini-Series) as Shakhov
 A Man Before His Time (1972) as Uncle Jean
 Much Ado About Nothing (1973) as Leonato
 A Very English Murder (1974) as Warbeck
 Agony (1974) as Dr. Lasovert
 From Dawn Till Sunset (1975) as Savely, a singer in a restaurant
 Take Aim (1975) as Leo Szilard (uncredited)
 Eternal Call (1976, TV Series) as Shef kontrrazvedki
 Father Sergius (1977) as hegumen
 Lenin in Paris (1981) as Zhitomirsky
 Moon Rainbow (1983) as Martin Weber
 Chance (1984) as Nikita Savich
 Time of Desires (1984) as Andrey Sergeyevich
 Contract (1985, Short) as representative of a company (voice)
 Do Not Marry, Girls (1985) as Boris Alexandrovich, Minister
 The End of Eternity (1987) as Sennor Calculator

References

External links

1920 births
Actors from Odesa
2002 deaths
Russian male actors
Soviet male stage actors
Russian male stage actors
Soviet male film actors
Russian male film actors
Soviet male voice actors
Russian male voice actors
Recipients of the Order "For Merit to the Fatherland", 4th class
People's Artists of the RSFSR
Honored Artists of the RSFSR
Burials at Vagankovo Cemetery
Soviet people of World War II